Emily Carr University of Art + Design (abbreviated as ECU) is a public art university located in Vancouver, British Columbia, Canada. The university's campus is located within the Great Northern Way Campus in Strathcona. The university is a co-educational institution that operates four academic faculties, the Faculty of Culture + Community, the Ian Gillespie Faculty of Design + Dynamic Media, the Audian Faculty of Art, and the Jake Kerr Faculty of Graduate Studies.

The school was established in 1925 as the Vancouver School of Decorative and Applied Arts. During the 20th century, the school was renamed three times, the Vancouver School of Art in 1933, the Emily Carr College of Art and Design in 1978, and the Emily Carr Institute of Art + Design in 1995. The university was able to issue its own degrees by 1994 and began offering its first graduate programs in 2003. In 2008, the institution was designated as a special purpose teaching university under the province's University Act.

History
Emily Carr is one of the oldest post-secondary institutions in British Columbia and the only one dedicated to professional education and learning in the arts, media, and design. Formerly known as the Vancouver School of Art, it was established in 1925 as the Vancouver School of Decorative and Applied Arts. In 1978, ECU was designated a provincial institute before moving to Granville Island in 1980. A second building on Granville Island was opened in 1995. In 1995, ECU was granted authority to offer bachelor's degrees—BFAs and BDes—and honorary degrees: honorary Doctor of Letters (D.Litt.), honorary Doctor of Laws (D.Laws), and honorary Doctor of Technology (D.Technology). In 1997, ECU was granted authority to offer Bachelor of Media Arts degrees (BMA). In 2006, ECI launched a Master of Applied Arts (MAA), and opened the Intersections Digital Studio. In 2007, the Great Northern Way consortium made up of Emily Carr, UBC, SFU and BCIT launched the Master of Digital Media program (MDM) at the Great Northern Way Campus.

Emily Carr Institute of Art and Design's arms, supporters, flag, and badge were registered with the Canadian Heraldic Authority on April 20, 2007. On April 28th, 2008, the Provincial Government announced that it would amend the University Act at the Legislative Assembly of British Columbia and recognize Emily Carr Institute of Art and Design as a full university, which would be named Emily Carr University of Art and Design. The university began its operation under the new name on September 1, 2008.

On September 5, 2017, the university moved from its home on Granville Island to a new campus at 520 East 1st Avenue, near Great Northern Way between Main and Clark streets. The purpose-built building was a former industrial site of Finning International, and is in the Mount Pleasant neighborhood of East Vancouver.

In 2019 the University's library became a fine-free institution in order to improve patron behaviour and the experience of students.

Campus

The university's campus is located within a four-storey  building completed in Strathcona, Vancouver. Designed by Diamond Schmitt Architects and completed by EllisDon in 2017, the building houses informal gather spaces, exhibition spaces and studios; and three lecture theatres, including one 400-seat venue. The exterior facade of the building has white metal panels and glass reminiscent of a blank canvas, as well as a back-painted glass spandrel panels to evoke a sequence of colour and transition of an artistic colour palette. The colour palette was selected by Emily Carr faculty member Landon Mackenzie and another colleague. The colours were selected in honour of the painter Emily Carr. Several First Nations design elements were also incorporated into the building's design.

The building forms a part of the larger Great Northern Way Campus, a  property that is equally shared with four other postsecondary institutions through the Great Northern Way Trust. Emily Carr University, along with the British Columbia Institute of Technology, Simon Fraser University, and the University of British Columbia, are all equal shareholders in the trust. Great Northern Way Campus also houses facilities used by the other three postsecondary institutions. The Centre for Digital Media is an institution located on the Great Northern Way Campus that is managed by the four partner universities.

Academics
Emily Carr specializes in sustainable design, photography, new media, visual arts, media, interactive media, animation, industrial design, product design, ceramics, sculpture, communication design, illustration and fine arts.

Degree programs include:
 Bachelor of Fine Arts in Cultural and Critical Practices, Illustration, Photography, or Visual Arts. Visual arts majors can choose to specialize in painting, ceramics, drawing, print media, or sculpture and extended practices.
 Bachelor of Design in Communication Design, Interaction Design or Industrial Design.
 Bachelor of Media Arts in Animation, Film and Screen Arts, or New Media and Sound Arts.
 Master of Fine Arts in Visual Arts.
 Master of Design with Interdisciplinary and User Experience (UX) options.

Research
In November 2009, Emily Carr University teamed up with Lucasfilm spinoff, Kerner Studios, to announce the establishment of a stereoscopic 3-D research studio.
In 2014, Canada Research Chairs Garnet Hertz and Amber Frid-Jimenez joined Emily Carr, making it the first art and design institution in the country with Canada Research Chairs. In 2015, a third Canada Research Chair joined the university until leaving in 2021.

Arms

Notable people

Alumni

 Kate Ali
 Unity Bainbridge
 Arnold Belkin
 Alexandra Bischoff
 Phillip Borsos
 Molly Lamb Bobak
 Emily Kai Bock
 Annie Briard
 Karin Bubaš
 Arabella Campbell
 Neko Case
 Douglas Coupland
 Stan Douglas
 Kevin Eastwood
 Geoffrey Farmer
 Ann Marie Fleming
 Tommy Genesis
 Angela Grossmann
 Colleen Heslin
 E. J. Hughes
 Carole Itter
 Donald Jarvis
 Lynn Johnston
 Brian Jungen
 Ann Kipling
 Terence Koh
 Brian Kokoska
 Attila Richard Lukacs
 Julian Lawrence
 Irene Luxbacher
 Jeannie Mah
 Sara Mameni
 Annie Liu
 Dandilion Wind Opaine
 Frank Palmer
 Jack Shadbolt
 Edith L. Sharp
 Jeremy Shaw
 Elise Siegel
 Heather Spears
 Jeff Chiba Stearns
 Merike Talve
 Ronald Thom
 Renée Van Halm
 Ola Volo
 Joy Zemel Long

Faculty and emeriti

 Gina Adams
 Julie Andreyev
 Marian Penner Bancroft
 Ron Burnett
 Peg Campbell
 Randy Lee Cutler
 Garnet Hertz
 Maria Hupfield (Wasauksing Ojibwe)
 Landon Mackenzie
 Sandra Semchuk
 Gregory Scofield (Métis)
 Durwin Talon
 Henry Tsang
 Frederick Varley
 Ian Wallace
 Rita Wong

See also
Higher education in British Columbia
List of colleges and universities named after people
List of universities in British Columbia

References

External links

 
Educational institutions established in 1925
1925 establishments in Canada
Universities and colleges in Vancouver
Colleges in British Columbia
Art schools in Canada